Robert Rico (born 10 March 1945) is a French former professional footballer who played as an attacking midfielder. He was capped once for the France national team in 1970.

Personal life 
Robert's brother Jocelyn was also a footballer.

Honours 
Rennes

 Coupe de France: 1970–71
Nancy

 Division 2: 1974–75

References

1945 births
Living people
People from Agadir
French footballers
Moroccan people of French descent
Moroccan footballers
Association football midfielders
US Concarneau players
Stade Rennais F.C. players
Stade de Reims players
FC Girondins de Bordeaux players
AS Nancy Lorraine players
SR Saint-Dié players
Ligue 1 players
Ligue 2 players
France international footballers
Sportspeople from Finistère
Footballers from Brittany